Schneiter is a surname. Notable people with the surname include:

Andrés Schneiter, Argentine tennis player  
Heinz Schneiter (1935–2017), Swiss footballer
Jean-Louis Schneiter (1933–2016), French politician
John Schneiter, Swiss bobsledder 
Pierre Schneiter (1905–1978), French politician
Werner Schneiter (born 1946), Swiss long-distance runner